Jaroszów may refer to the following places in Poland:
Jaroszów, Lower Silesian Voivodeship (south-west Poland)
Jaroszów, Silesian Voivodeship (south Poland)